The Folkwang University of the Arts is a university for music, theater, dance, design, and academic studies, located in four German cities of North Rhine-Westphalia. Since 1927, its traditional main location has been in the former Werden Abbey in Essen in the Ruhr area, with additional facilities in Duisburg, Bochum, and Dortmund, and, since 2010, at the Zeche Zollverein, a World Heritage Site also in Essen. The Folkwang University is home to the international dance company Folkwang Tanz Studio (FTS).

History

The university shares its unusual name with the Museum Folkwang founded in 1902 by arts patron Karl Ernst Osthaus. The term Folkwang derives from Fólkvangr, the Old Norse name of a mythical meadow where the dead gather who are chosen by Freyja, the Norse goddess of love and beauty, to spend the afterlife with her. The school's founders, opera director , stage designer Hein Heckroth  and choreographer Kurt Jooss, regarded this Folkwang as a symbol for the arts as a unified whole, rather than divided into separate classes. The Folkwangschule für Musik, Tanz und Sprechen (Folkwang School for Music, Dance, and Speech) opened in 1927 in Essen, and in 1928 a previously established school of design merged with the institution.

In 1963 the Folkwang school was renamed Folkwang-Hochschule (Folkwang Academy). In 2010 the institution began offering graduate studies and was renamed Folkwang University of the Arts. This coincided with Ruhr.2010, the festival in which the Ruhr district was designated the European Capital of Culture for the year 2010.

Activities

The Folkwang University unites training in music, theatre, dance, design, and scholarship, in order to encourage collaboration among the arts.

Undergraduate courses:
 Instrumental training for different musical instruments (accordion, bassoon, cello, clarinet, double bass, flute, guitar, harp, harpsichord, horn, oboe, organ, percussion, piano, recorder, saxophone, trombone, trumpet, tuba, viola, violin)
 Jazz / Performing Artist
 Integrative composition (instrumental composition, electronic composition, jazz composition, pop composition, composition and visualisation)
 Church music
 Voice (concert performance, Lieder, oratorio and music theatre)
 School Music
 Music pedagogy
 Musicology in combination with an artistic subject
 Musicals
 Acting
 Physical Theatre
 Directing
 Dance
 Industrial Design
 Communication Design
 Photography
Advanced programs:
 Orchestral playing
 Conducting (orchestral/choir)
 Vocal Ensemble Direction
 Musicology in combination with an artistic discipline
 Chamber music
 Composition (electronic composition, instrumental composition, instrumental/electronic composition)
 Concert Performance
 Solo Dance
 Choreography
 Labanotation
 Dance Pedagogy

Faculty
Faculty have included:

 Hermann Baumann, hornist
 Young-Chang Cho, cellist
 Anna Erler-Schnaudt, contralto
 Catherine Gayer, coloratura soprano
 Wilfried Gruhn (music pedagogy)
 Hansgünther Heyme, theatre director
 Chris Houlding
 Nicolaus A. Huber
 Ifor James
 Peter Janssens
 Kurt Jooss
 Nicola Jürgensen (b. 1975), clarinet
 Uwe Köller
 Scott Lawton, conductor
 Fritz Lehmann, conductor
 Frank Lloyd, hornist
 Lore Lorentz
 Lauren Newton
 Walter Nicks
 Ralf Otto (born 1956), choral conducting
 Krzysztof Penderecki (1966 to 1968), composer
 Reinhard Peters (1926–2008), conductor
 Gudrun Schröfel choral conducting
 Gerhard Stäbler
 Rita Streich, operatic soprano
 Paul Tortelier
 Adolf Wamper (1901–1977), sculptor

Alumni 
Alumni include:

 Pina Bausch (1940–2009), choreographer
 Anne Bierwirth, contralto
 Max Burchartz
 Andreas Deja
 Vladimir Djambazov (born 1954), composer, french horn, sound designer
 Stefan Dohr (born 1965), principal horn player of the Berlin Philharmonic
 Tommy Finke
 Thomas Gabriel (composer) (born 1957)
 Agnes Giebel (born 1920), soprano
 Ulrike Grossarth (born 1952), dancer and visual artist
 Klara Höfels (1949–2022), actress and producer
 Hilmar Hoffmann (1925–2018), founder of Oberhausen film festival, cultural politician in Frankfurt, director of Goethe-Institut
 Reinhild Hoffmann (born 1943), choreographer
 Siegfried Jerusalem (born 1940), tenor
 Salome Kammer (born 1959), cellist, vocalist
 David Kamp
 Heinz Kiwitz
 Helmut Koch (conductor) (1908–1975), conductor, choir leader, broadcasting manager, composer
 Susanne Linke
 Christof Loy (born 1962), opera director
 Gerd Ludwig
 Ann Mandrella
 John McGuire (composer)
 Adéọlá Ọlágúnjú
 Carlos Orta
 Jürgen Prochnow (born 1941), actor
 Andreas Pruys, bass
 Karl Ridderbusch (1932–1997), bass
 Armin Rohde (born 1955), actor
 Thomas Ruff
Magdalene Schauss-Flake (1921-2008), composer and organist
Stefanie Schneider
 Peter Schwickerath (born 1942), sculptor
 Harald Siepermann, animator and character designer
 Ruth Siewert (1915–2002), contralto
 Anton Stankowski
 Günther Strupp
Raphael Thoene
 Graham Waterhouse (born 1962), composer and cellist
 Dirk Weiler
 Greta Wrage von Pustau, dancer and dance teacher

See also 
 Folkwang Kammerorchester Essen

References

Further reading

External links

Folkwang University
Folkwang Tanz-Studio
ICEM Institute For Computer Music and Electronic Media  (in German)

 
Dance education in Germany
Music schools in Germany
Performing arts education in Germany
Educational institutions established in 1927
1927 establishments in Germany
Universities and colleges in North Rhine-Westphalia